Leslie Dixon is an American screenwriter and film producer. She began her career as an original screenwriter, writing films such as 1987's Outrageous Fortune and Overboard. She then moved into adaptations and re-writes, developing the screenplays for: Mrs. Doubtfire, The Thomas Crown Affair, Pay It Forward, and Hairspray. She has also produced a variety of films, and the television series Limitless.

Biography

Early life
Leslie Dixon is the granddaughter of photographer Dorothea Lange and landscaper painter Maynard Dixon. Dixon grew up in the California Bay Area. At the age of 18, she was living alone in San Francisco without enough money to afford college. Once she realized that she wanted to pursue writing, she moved to Hollywood at the age of 26 with hopes of making her way into the film industry. Having no contacts within the industry, she began by working office jobs for several years and eventually landed a job as a script reader. During her time as a script reader, she studied the scripts she was reading. She learned the structure of scripts, their layout on the page, the elements that were needed in order to make a script appealing and successful, and she recognized the types of scripts that gained the most attention from producers. This gave her insight into "what was and wasn’t being bought". After a year of living in Hollywood, she wrote her first screenplay (written with an unknown co-writer). Her partner got an agent attached to the piece, and after receiving two offers, it was sold to Columbia Pictures for $30,000. However, the screenplay never made it to production.

Career
Her first solo screenplay was Outrageous Fortune (1987), written for Shelley Long and Bette Midler. The idea for the screenplay came at Robert Cort's request for a "female buddy film". From 1987 to 1997, Dixon continued to write romantic comedies, including Overboard (1987), Loverboy (1989), Mrs. Doubtfire (1993), and That Old Feeling (1997). She also wrote an adaptation for The Thomas Crown Affair (1999), a re-write from Alan Trustman's original screenplay in 1968, and then the drama Pay It Forward (2000) based on Catherine Ryan Hyde's 1999 novel of the same name. After reading Alan Glynn's The Dark Fields, she wrote Limitless (2011).

In 2004, Dixon was nominated for a Saturn Award for Best Writing for her Freaky Friday (2003) screenplay.

Personal life
She is married to fellow screenwriter, producer and director Tom Ropelewski. Their son was born January 16, 1996. They reside in Beverly Hills, California.

Filmography

Feature films

TV shows

References

External links 
 

Living people
Year of birth missing (living people)
People from Beverly Hills, California
American film producers
American women screenwriters
Film producers from California
Writers from the San Francisco Bay Area
Screenwriters from California
American women film producers
21st-century American women